William Richard Hillyer (5 March 1813 – 8 January 1861), was a prominent 19th century English professional cricketer for Kent County Cricket Club, Marylebone Cricket Club (MCC) and many other sides in the days before county and international cricket was organised into regular competitions. He was born at Leybourne in Kent in 1813, the son of an innkeeper.

Hillyer first played for Kent in 1834 and was the "principal bowler" for the county teams until 1853. He took at least 514 wickets for Kent teams in 89 matches - a figure which is not precise as bowling figures were frequently not recorded accurately. At the time, scores were generally low due to the roughness of pitches, which were kept short by sheep and rolled if at all only with a light roller. Playing in an era when round-arm bowling had taken over from underarm but before overarm bowling was legalised, Hillyer bowled a little above medium pace from a "shuffling run" with a beautifully simple delivery, and was tremendously difficult to score off of due to his gain of pace off the pitch, ability to make the ball come with his arm (from leg to off) and constant shooters which bowled many batsmen. He recorded at least 149 five-wicket hauls and took 10 wickets in a match at least 54 times, and 13 in at least 14 matches.

By the tail end of the 1830s he was already established as one of the leading bowlers in English cricket. During the 1840s he was statistically unmatched. Until the days of James Southerton no bowler ever took so many wickets in a season as Hillyer's 174 in 1845 - his nearest rival, Jemmy Dean, had taken 100. He took most first-class wickets in English cricket in each season from 1842 to 1849. As a batsman Hillyer was more modest and he only reached 40 three times. Nonetheless, in by far his highest innings, Hillyer became the first player to accomplish the still-treasured feat of a "match double", scoring 26 and 83 and taking 13 wickets for Marylebone Cricket Club (MCC) against Oxford University in 1847.

He had first played for the Town Malling club and was employed as a professional by Marylebone Cricket Club (MCC) at Lord's between 1838 and 1851, playing regularly in Gentlemen v Players matches during the period.

From 1850 onwards, Hillyer began to decline badly, suffering from rheumatism and, beginning in 1852, he began to umpire as was normal practice with professional players of the day. He fell and broke his thumb in 1855 which forced his retirement as a cricketer. He died at Maidstone in Kent in 1861, aged 47.

References

External links

1813 births
1861 deaths
All-England Eleven cricketers
English cricketers
English cricketers of 1826 to 1863
Kent cricketers
Surrey cricketers
North v South cricketers
Players cricketers
Marylebone Cricket Club cricketers
Gentlemen of Nottinghamshire cricketers
Cambridge Town Club cricketers
Fast v Slow cricketers
Gentlemen of Kent cricketers